A cingulum militare was a piece of ancient Roman military equipment in the form of a belt decorated with metal fittings, which was worn as a badge of military status by soldiers and officials. Many examples were made in the Roman province of Pannonia.

The belt was composed of the following parts:

 Balteus: Hanging band that was compounded for an overall band.
 Bulla: Rivets on the baltea.
 Pensilium: Pendant at the end of the straps of the belt.
 Lamna: Discus at the end of each apron strip that embrace the pensilium.
 Fibula: Buckle of the belt.

The cingulum militare was used in conjunction with the helmet (galea), the shield (scutum), the overall armor on the upper body (lorica hamata), a dagger (pugio), and a sword (gladius).

See also
Roman military personal equipment
Lorica segmentata

References

The Roman Soldier's Belt

Ancient Roman military equipment
Ancient Roman legionary equipment